John Reading may refer to:

John Reading (clergyman) (1588–1667), English Calvinist and Biblical commentator.
John Reading (composer and organist) (c. 1645 – 1692), father of:
John Reading (composer, organist and copyist) (c. 1685 – 1764)
Colonel John Reading (d. 1717), father of Governor John Reading (New Jersey governor)
John Reading (New Jersey governor) (1686–1767), Acting Colonial Governor of New Jersey, 1747–48, 1757–58
John Roberts Reading (1826–1886),  U.S. Representative from Pennsylvania
John H. Reading (1917–2003), Mayor of Oakland, California 1966–1977

See also
John of Reading (d. 1346), scholastic philosopher